Robert Mitchell was a Scottish architect, prominent in the early 18th century. He worked for a period with his brother and fellow architect John Mitchell.

Selected works

Moor Place, Hertfordshire (1775)
Preston Hall, Midlothian (1791)
Rotunda, Leicester Square, London (1793)
Old Parish Church, Peterhead (1804)
Nelson's Column, Montreal (1809)
Crimond Church (1812)

References
Specific

General
A Biographical Dictionary of British Architects 1600–1840 (Howard Colvin; 2008)
"The First Panorama" - Crouch Rare Books

External links
Robert Mitchell's profile at The British Museum
Robert Mitchell - Art Public Montreal

18th-century Scottish architects
19th-century Scottish architects
Architects from Edinburgh
Date of birth missing
Date of death missing